The Way West is a 1949 western novel by A. B. Guthrie, Jr. The book won the Pulitzer Prize for Fiction in 1950 and became the basis for a film starring Kirk Douglas, Robert Mitchum, and Richard Widmark.

The novel is one in the sequence of six by A. B. Guthrie, Jr. dealing with the Oregon Trail and the development of Montana from 1830, the time of the mountain men, to "the cattle empire of the 1880s to the near present".  The publication sequence started with The Big Sky, followed by The Way West, These Thousand Hills, Arfive (1971), The Last Valley (1975), and Fair Land, Fair Land.

The first three books of the six in chronological story sequence (but not in the sequence of publishing) — The Big Sky, The Way West, and Fair Land, Fair Land — are in themselves a complete trilogy, starting in 1830 with Boone Caudill leaving Kentucky to become a mountain man and ending with the death of Caudill and later the death of Dick Summers in the 1870s.

Plot introduction
Former senator William Tadlock leads a wagon train along the Oregon Trail from Missouri with the help of hired guide Dick Summers. After several accidents which cost settlers' lives, a mutiny of sorts develops and his position is overtaken by Lije Evans. Soon, different factions develop amongst the people of the train as they try to survive their trek to Oregon.

Release details
1949, US, W. Sloane (ISBN NA), Pub date ? ? 1949, hardback (First edition)
2002, US, Mariner Books, Pub date ? January 2002, paperback

References

External links
 Photos of the first edition of The Way West

1949 American novels
Pulitzer Prize for Fiction-winning works
Western (genre) novels
Novels by A. B. Guthrie Jr.
Pre-statehood history of Montana
Oregon Trail
Novels set in Missouri
Novels set in Oregon
Midwestern United States in fiction
Northwestern United States in fiction
American novels adapted into films